The Bogyoke Aung San bridge is a bridge crossing over the Thanlwin River in Mawlamyine, Myanmar and connects Mawlamyine to Chaungzon. The bridge is also known as the Bilu Kyun Bridge. It was officially opened to the public on May 9, 2017.

Information
It is 28 feet wide and has a two-way steel arch bridge. The Mupon approach road on the Moulmein side is the shorter of the roads at around 757 feet long. The Bilu Island Ka Kyaw approach road is 16,980 feet long. On April 26, 2017, at 9 PM, a sign was erected under the name Bogyoke Aung San Bridge (Bilu Island) and on April 27, at approximately 9:45 AM, motorcycles and cars were allowed to pass the bridge free of charge.

Controversy 
The actual construction began under the name Thanlwin Bridge (Chaungzon), but at the end of the construction, the Pyithu Hluttaw had approved the name Bogyoke Aung San Bridge. Some local Mon ethnic groups staged multiple protests in March 2017 to rename it as the Thanlwin Bridge (Chaungzon). As of April 26, 2017, the petition has received about 150,000 signatures.

On April 5, 2017, fourteen political parties issued a statement that "The government should seriously reconsider naming the Bogyoke Aung San Bridge as it will not contribute to the national reconciliation and it will not undermine the national unity."

MP from Paung Township Mi Kun Chan's proposal to name Bogyoke Aung San Bridge was approved by a split vote in the Pyithu Hluttaw on 14 January 2017 with a total of 217 votes in favor and 2 abstentions. There were 43 votes against. The nomination was won due to 116 neutral votes.

References 

Bridges in Myanmar